David Balcombe Wingate OBE, born October 11, 1935, is an ornithologist, naturalist and conservationist. He was born in Bermuda.

In 1951 he helped Robert Cushman Murphy and Louis S. Mowbray re-discover a bird species thought extinct since the 1620s, the Bermuda petrel or cahow.

This spurred him on to study Zoology at Cornell University, returning to take on the challenge of saving the cahow in 1958. He went on to become the Conservation Officer for the Bermuda Government Parks Department from 1966 to his retirement in 2000.

He was credited with rediscovering the black-capped petrel in Haiti in 1963.

His lifelong efforts to bring back the cahow from near-extinction led him to undertake the holistic restoration of an entire barren island's pre-colonial ecology, in a project known as the Nonsuch Island 'Living museum', reintroducing several other species in the process.

He has been honoured with a number of awards. These include the Queen's Honours (UK), the MBE and OBE; King's Honours (Netherlands), Ridder, Order of the Golden Ark; the  United Nations' Global 500 Award and Dr.of Sci. Honoris causa, Clark University, Massachusetts. In 1991 he was awarded the Linnaean Society of New York's Eisenmann Medal.  In 2007 he was nominated for the 2008 Indianapolis prize and in 2017 he was honoured with a Lifetime Achievement award from  BirdsCaribbean. In 2012, a biography was published about his life's work.

He has three daughters. His eldest daughter, Janet, has written an award-winning educational autobiography about her father's Nonsuch project, which has been adopted by the Bermuda Education Ministry as a schoolbook. More recently, Rare Birds: The Extraordinary Tale of the Bermuda Petrel and the Man Who Brought It Back from Extinction, a biography of Wingate and the story of his fight to save the cahows, was published in October 2012.

External links
 Gehrman, Elizabeth. Rare Birds: The Extraordinary Tale of the Bermuda Petrel and the Man Who Brought It Back from Extinction (Boston: Beacon Press, 2012).
 'Assembling Complexity' more on Wingate's holistic restoration methods, from Kevin Kelly's book 'Out of Control'
 'Bermuda's Treasure Island' and 'Sceilligs and Bermuda - A Last Refuge', (2005) two film documentary versions by Deirdre Brennan and Éamon de Buitléar featuring David Wingate's cahow and Nonsuch Island restoration projects - news release
 Citations and Articles
 'Island treasure' a short biography of David Wingate in the Bermudian newspaper The Royal Gazette cf the Indianapolis prize nomination .
 'Nature's Restoration' (2006)  by Peter Friederici features David Wingate's restoration work
 'Nonsuch Summer' (2005)  by Janet A. Wingate, excerpt online  2nd edition (2014) 
 'Rare Bird' (2005) Feature film documentary about David Wingate's lifetime achievement by Lucinda Spurling
 from Lucinda Spurling's film Rare Bird
  IMDB page on Rare Bird
 Film about David Wingate website
 'Strategies for successful biodiversity conservation...' illustrated article by David B. Wingate review
 "There Are Problems When Man Plays God", an article on Wingate and the cahow in Sports Illustrated magazine, November 4, 1968

Bermudian ornithologists
Bermudian naturalists
Ecologists
Conservationists
Cornell University alumni
Living people
1935 births